The 1990 World Fencing Championships were held in Lyon, France. The event took place from July 8 to July 16, 1990.

Medal summary

Men's events

Women's events

Medal table

References

FIE Results

World Fencing Championships
1990 in French sport
Sports competitions in Lyon
International fencing competitions hosted by France
1990 in fencing
July 1990 sports events in Europe
20th century in Lyon